Notre-Dame de Guérison (French for "Our Lady the Healer") is a Christian sanctuary situated in Courmayeur, at the foot of Mont Chétif, along the Val Veny road that leads to the Seigne pass, also known as the "Cremonis Iugum" (Cremona Pass), used by the Romans to reach Gaul. It is well-known both in Italy and abroad, not only because of the surrounding landscape, but because it is very easy to reach by car from May to November and above all, is situated very close to an internationally famous tourist resort.

History
The first exact dates regarding the place  go back to 8 May 1537 when the name "Berrier", the name by which the sanctuary was called, appears in a donation document. This word has Celtic origins and means “a pile of large rocks”. Around 1690 a statue of the Virgin was placed in a protective niche there. This statue became the object of a legal dispute among the priest, the diocesan administration and a Courmayeur family, which resulted in the sanctuary's destruction.

The sanctuary was re-built in 1781 by Jean-Michel Truchet, with a project approved by Courmayeur parish priest Jean-Martin Dondeynaz, and the chapel was consecrated in 1792. But the Brenva Glacier, which had been expanding since 1800, shifted the moraine that surrounded the sanctuary, causing it to collapse. On  22 May 1821 it was decided to rebuild the chapel again and, in 1840, a room was added for the caretaker: Laurent Girard, known for being one of the last Aosta Valley hermits.

An increase in devotees lead to inept extension works in 1850, making the chapel unstable and subject to water infiltration so that “when it rains or snows, the wall next to the rock leaks and the chapel turns into a small lake”. The present building, erected by the entrepreneur Filippo Franchini between 1867 and 1869, is characterized by a Neo-Classical style, measures slightly more than 100 sq. metres and has a Latin-cross plan. In the first half of the 20th century some rooms were added for the priest, as well as a gallery to hold the votive offerings.

The present
The arches and walls of the sanctuary are covered with a cycle of frescoes and three oils on canvas by the painter Giuseppe Stornone from Ivrea (1816-1890), who specialized in religious paintings of large dimension as well as vast cycles of frescoes and was influenced by the Italian baroque style.

Many of the votive offerings are for alpinists who have escaped danger while climbing Mont Blanc or crossing many of its passes. There is a silver miniature model of the ship Stella Polare, a former Norwegian whaler which, in 1899, took Umberto Cagni and his crew on an unsuccessful mission to reach the North Pole. The survivors brought the model as a gift on 23 June 1901, as thanks for the sanctuary's prayers during the journey. Pope John-Paul II and Pope Benedict XVI, during their summer holidays in Aosta Valley, visited the sanctuary on many occasions.

References

Religious buildings and structures in Italy
Buildings and structures in Aosta Valley
Tourist attractions in Aosta Valley
Courmayeur